Quiet Night may refer to:

 "Quiet Night", a song from the 1937 musical On Your Toes
 Quiet Night (play), a 1941 Australian play by Dorothy Blewett
 Quiet Night (album), a 2014 album by South Korean singer-songwriter Seo Taiji

See also
 Quiet Nights (disambiguation)